William Alington (died 19 October 1446), lord of the manor of both Bottisham and Horseheath, Cambridgeshire, was Speaker of the House of Commons of England, Treasurer of the Exchequer of Ireland, Treasurer of Normandy and High Sheriff of Cambridgeshire and Huntingdonshire.

Biography

William Alington is said to have been the son of William Alington and Denise Malet. He married Joan (d.1446), said to have been the daughter of William Burgh and the widow of one Barnes.

Alington was appointed High Sheriff of Cambridgeshire and Huntingdonshire in 1414 and 1423. He was elected to Parliament in 1410, 1416 and 1429 as Knight of the Shire for Cambridgeshire and elected Speaker of the House in 1429. 

He was Privy Councillor to Henry IV and Henry V. He was very close to Henry V's younger brother Thomas of Lancaster,  Duke of Clarence, who was Lord Lieutenant of Ireland 1404-13. Alington accompanied him to Ireland and served as Lord Treasurer of Ireland. Later he served in Normandy and held several high offices, including Treasurer and Receiver-General.

Family
Alington's two sons, William (d. 5 July 1459), of Horseheath, and Robert, of Bottisham, both married daughters of the famous Sir John Argentyne of Great Wymondley Manor, Hertfordshire, by his wife Margaret Calthorpe (1380–1427). By this marriage William Alington the younger acquired the manor of Wymondley, which was held in Grand Sergeanty by the service of presenting the first cup at the Coronation of Kings of England, which service was performed by the Lords of that Manor into the 20th century.

Notes

References

{{cite book |last=Burke |first=Sir Bernard |year=1883 |title=Ulster King of Arms Dormant, Abeyant, Forfeited and Extinct Peerages of the British Empire |location=London |page=4|title-link=Norroy and Ulster King of Arms }}

Further reading
See also the earlier publication: The Cambridgeshire Visitation'' by Henry St. George, 1619, (from MSS. Phillipps, No. 63, Edited by Sir T. Banks. Bart., and published by C. Gilmour, 1840), contains a large pedigree on page 2, of Alington, of Battersham, [sic] upon which can be seen this gentleman and his wife and their children).

1446 deaths
People from Bottisham
Speakers of the House of Commons of England
High Sheriffs of Cambridgeshire and Huntingdonshire
Members of the Privy Council of England
Year of birth unknown
Lords of the Manor
People from Horseheath
English MPs 1410
English MPs October 1416
English MPs 1429